Yuriy Vasilyevich Utkin (born April 6, 1939) is a Russian political figure and political scientist. He was a member of the State Duma of the Russian Federation from 1993 to 1999. He is the author of many laws of the Russian Federation on problems of ecology. He is a doctor of philosophy, the Grand doctor of philosophy, professor, the founder of some machines for covering pipes. He is the author of many scientific papers and five books and monographs. He trained five Ph.Ds in Russia.

References

Russian political scientists
Russian ecologists
1939 births
Living people
First convocation members of the State Duma (Russian Federation)
Second convocation members of the State Duma (Russian Federation)